Abel is a 1986 Dutch film directed by Alex van Warmerdam who also scripted and played the lead character. Other lead roles were played by Henri Garcin, Annet Malherbe and Olga Zuiderhoek. Supporting roles were played by Loes Luca and Arend Jan Heerma van Voss among others. Its music was written by Vincent van Waterdam and the film was distributed by First Floor Features.

Plot
Abel is a 31-year-old man who still lives with his parents. Due to agoraphobia, he hasn't been out for over 10 years, much to the chagrin of his father, Victor. On the other hand, he gets spoiled by his mother, Duif. He spends most of his days spying on the neighbors, setting up his parents against each other, knowingly or unknowingly, and fruitlessly trying to cut flies in two with an enormous pair of scissors.

His father enlists a psychiatrist who deduces the cause of problems are the parents' unhealthy relation with Abel. He then summons a mesmerist who gets frustrated by Abel. Victor then tries to set up his son with a girl in his theater society, it too fails. After a lot of planning, the mother and son secretly buy a TV-set against Victor's wishes. When Victor discovers this deception he gets furious and runs his son out on to the streets.

Abel meets Zus, who works at a peepshow called "De Naakte Meisjes" (The naked girls). She takes pity on him and starts a relation with him. Abel finds out Zus has a relationship with a married man and it turned out to be his own father. In the meantime, his mother finds out Abel's whereabouts and informs her husband. When Victor knows his Son is in a relationship with his favoured prostitute, he becomes enraged and goes into a psychotic fit. A confrontation with Abel and his parents takes place at Zus' place. The drunken Victor tries to chase Zus. His son informs Duif that Victor had an extramarital affair with Zus. Duif threatens to commit suicide. Though when she finds neither her beloved son or husband takes her seriously, she calms down and finally leaves her son with the prostitute and takes her husband home. Finally Abel laughs at all this with Zus and cuts a fly into two with his scissors.

Cast
 Alex van Warmerdam  -  Abel, son
 Henri Garcin  -  Victor, father 
 Olga Zuiderhoek  -  Duif, mother 
 Annet Malherbe  -  Zus, prostitute
 Arend Jan Heerma van Voss  -  psychiatrist
 Anton Kothuis  -  mesmerist
 Loes Luca  -  Christine, the girl arranged by Victor for Abel's date
 Peer Mascini  -  director

Production
Abel was Van Warmerdam's directional debut. He at first planned to make the movie in black and white but others discouraged this and he chose colour instead. The vast majority of the movie is situated in a fictive kind of Dutch fifties. Abel had over 300 000 viewers at its premiere, and it received a Gouden Kalf for 'Best film' and a Gouden Kalf for 'Best director'. In 1990 the tragedic comedy was named Best Dutch Film of the eighties by the Kring van Nederlandse Journalisten. In 2000 Abel was released on DVD. Abel was produced in collaboration with Orkater and the VPRO.

External links
 

Dutch comedy films
1986 films
1980s Dutch-language films
Films directed by Alex van Warmerdam